The URBA mass transport system in France was a suspended monorail design that used suction to lift the train off its rail. It was designed by the Compagnie d'Energetique Lineaire mb. The URBA 4 and URBA 8 prototypes carried 4 and 8 passengers respectively. Propulsion was provided by Merin Gerin linear motors. The intention was to manufacture vehicles to 30 (URBA 30) or 100 passengers (URBA 100).

Notes

Monorails
Rail transport in France
Hovertrains